Knocknacarry (– referring to a weir diverted off the River Dun which operated a watermill) is a hamlet and townland (of 155 acres) about 1 kilometre west of Cushendun and 17 kilometres south-east of Ballycastle in County Antrim, Northern Ireland. It is situated in the historic barony of Glenarm Lower and the civil parish of Layd. In the 2001 Census it had a population of 138 people. It is within the Causeway Coast and Glens Borough Council area.

Knocknacarry lies within the Antrim Coast and Glens Area of Outstanding Natural Beauty, designated in 1988.  St. Ciaran's Primary School, which also serves the village of Cushendun and the wider local area, is in Knocknacarry.

The river bed of the River Dun at Knocknacarry Bridge, north of Knocknacarry, is of scientific interest in the field of mineralogy and an example of Cushendun Granite.

References 

NI Neighbourhood Information System

External links 
 Photo: Entering the village of Knocknacarry from the south-west
 A selection of photographs of Knocknacarry over the last century

See also 
List of villages in Northern Ireland
Barmeen (a townland near Knocknacarry)

Villages in County Antrim
Civil parish of Layd
Townlands of County Antrim